Genus is a furry erotic comic book originally published by Antarctic Press and continued by Radio Comix under its "Sin Factory" imprint. Issues contain sexually explicit stories and pin-up illustrations by various artists, featuring anthropomorphic animals, and are labeled for sale to adults only. The series began in June 1993, with 96 issues published as of 2015. Originally published in stapled format, later issues are square bound with higher page counts. Diamond Comic Distributors' catalog has described it as "the longest-running erotic comic anthology".

Genus Male is a related publication, intended for gay and bisexual male readers, featuring male characters. Thirteen issues were published annually by Radio Comix from 2002 through 2014. Issues have contained work by Daria McGrain, John Barrett, Miu, and others.

, there have been no additional issues of either title since 2015.

References

External links
Genus at WikiFur
Genus Male at WikiFur
The Gay Comics List review of Genus Male #1 and #2
John Barrett at WikiFur

1993 comics debuts
2015 comics endings
Furry fandom